The July 2016 North China cyclone was a devastating extratropical cyclone which produced torrential precipitation and caused widespread flash floods over North China and portions of nearby regions, resulting in at least 184 deaths and ¥33.19 billion (US$4.96 billion) of damage in China.

Meteorological history

The meiyu front persisted over the region between Huai River and Yangtze during mid-July 2016 since the dissipation of Typhoon Nepartak. Meanwhile, the subtropical ridge over the northwest Pacific Ocean was located unusually southward and westward, which blocked the Southwest Monsoon and made it completely flow into mainland China. On July 19, as the westerlies collided with the strong Southwest Monsoon, cyclogenesis began within the front and formed an extratropical cyclone over Henan, China at around 20:00 CST (12:00 UTC). Drifting north-northeastward with surface sustained winds below gale-force, the system started to weaken slowly in the province of Hebei after 14:00 CST (06:00 UTC) and occluded right before 02:00 CST (18:00 UTC) on July 21, owing to the disconnection from the Southwest Monsoon. It became almost stationary near Beijing until it dissipated after 20:00 CST (12:00 UTC) on July 21.

Impact

Throughout the municipalities of Beijing, Chongqing and Tianjin as well as the provinces of Guizhou, Hebei, Heilongjiang, Henan, Inner Mongolia, Jilin, Liaoning, Shandong, Shanxi, Sichuan and Yunnan, the extratropical cyclone brought torrential rainfalls and caused severe flash floods, which affected 15,597,000 people, with 184 deaths, 130 missing and ¥33.19 billion (US$4.96 billion) of damage. 575,000 people were evacuated, and 155,000 people need an emergency relief. More than 129,500 houses are collapsed, and at least 361,000 houses are damaged. The damaged agricultural areas are 12,049 km2, including  of the destroyed agricultural areas.

See also
2016 China floods
East Asian rainy season
Typhoon Nepartak (2016)

References

External links

CHINA: Torrential rains cause widespread flooding
Heavy rain hits capital of north China's Shanxi

Extratropical cyclones
2016 disasters in China
2016 floods in Asia
2016 meteorology
Weather events in China